All the qualified teams qualify for the 2013 Little League Softball World Series in Portland, Oregon

Qualified Teams

United States

Central
The tournament took place in Indianapolis, Indiana from July 20–25.

East
The tournament took place in Bristol, Connecticut from July 19–26.

Southeast
The tournament took place in Warner Robins, Georgia from July 25–30.

Southwest
The tournament took place in Waco, Texas from July 25–30.

West
The tournament took place in San Bernardino from July 19–26.

Oregon District #4
The tournament took place in Portland, Oregon at Alpenrose Dairy from July 15–19.

International

Asia Pacific
The tournament took place in Philippines from July 1–5.

Canada
The tournament took place in Victoria, British Columbia from August 1–5.

Europe and Africa
The tournament took place in Caronno Pertusella, Italy from July 10–15.

Latin America
The tournament took place in Maunabo, Puerto Rico from July 10–15.

References

2013 in softball
Little League Softball World Series